Mercury Court is a large office building in the business district in Liverpool City Centre, Liverpool.

The fascia of the building is formed from the frontage of the former Liverpool Exchange railway station, designed by architect Henry Shelmerdine. The railway station closed in 1977 and was replaced by Moorfields nearby.

The new build office block of Mercury Court was built in 1985 by Kingham Knight, on the site of the old station's platforms. It was redeveloped by Ashtenne Space to meet 21st-century office requirements 

Buildings and structures in Liverpool